Doris Katarina Uusitalo (born 17 October 1957), is a former Swedish footballer. Uusitalo was a member of the Swedish national team that won the 1984 European Competition for Women's Football.  After a cruciate ligament injury in 1987, Uusitalo was forced to retire from football. In 1985, Uusitalo won a Stora Grabbars och Tjejers Märke.

References

1957 births
Living people
Damallsvenskan players
Hammarby Fotboll (women) players
Swedish women's footballers
Sweden women's international footballers
Women's association football midfielders
UEFA Women's Championship-winning players